Luis Alejandro Guevara Cobos (born 26 August 1975) is a Mexican politician affiliated with the Institutional Revolutionary Party. From 2009 to 2012 he served as Deputy of the LXI Legislature of the Mexican Congress representing Tamaulipas. As of 2014 he served as Deputy of the LVII and LIX Legislatures of the Mexican Congress as a plurinominal representative.

References

1975 births
Living people
Politicians from Tamaulipas
Institutional Revolutionary Party politicians
21st-century Mexican politicians
People from Ciudad Mante
20th-century Mexican politicians
Deputies of the LIX Legislature of Mexico
Members of the Chamber of Deputies (Mexico) for Tamaulipas